Jonah is a 1982 Australian mini series based on the novel of the same name by Louis Stone. It is about Jonah, leader of a street gang who goes into business.

The novel was published in 1911.

Cast
Jonathan Sweet as Jonah
Clair Crowther as Ada
Liddy Clark as Pinkey
Doreen Warburton as Mrs. Yabsley
Steve Bisley as Cook
June Salter
Mark Hembrow as Waxy
Moya O'Sullivan		
Joseph Fürst as Hans Paach
Colin Croft as Old Dad
Ron Haddrick
Jennifer Hagan
Jane Harders		
Maggie Kirkpatrick

References

External links
Jonah at AustLit
Jonah at IMDb

1980s Australian television miniseries
1982 Australian television series debuts
1982 Australian television series endings
1982 television films
1982 films